Constance Anne Herschel (1855 - 1939), later known as Lady Lubbock, was a scientist and mathematician.

Herschel held the post of resident lecturer in natural sciences and mathematics at Girton College, Cambridge.

She was the child of Sir John Frederick William Herschel, and the grandchild of William Herschel. She wrote a family history of the famous scientific dynasty by compiling family sources, 'The Herschel Chronicle'.

She married Sir Neville Lubbock.

References 

1855 births
1939 deaths
British women mathematicians